Shrinathji is a form of Krishna, manifested as a seven-year-old child (Balak). The principal shrine of Shrinathji is the Shrinathji Temple in the temple city of Nathdwara, 48 kilometres north-east of Udaipur city in Rajasthan,India. Shrinathji is the central presiding deity of the Vaishnava sect known as Pushtimarg (the way of grace) or the Vallabha Sampradaya, established by Vallabhacharya. Shrinathji is worshipped mainly by the followers of Bhakti Yoga and the Vaishnavas in Gujarat and Rajasthan, and Bhatias amongst others.

Vitthal Nathji, son of Vallabhacharya institutionalised the worship of Shrinathji at Nathdwara. On account of the popularity of Shrinathji, Nathdwara city itself is referred to as ‘Shrinathji’. People also call it Bava's (Shreenathji Bava) Nagri.
Initially, the child Krishna deity was referred to as Devdaman ("the conqueror of Gods" referring to the over-powering of Indra by Krishna in the lifting of Govardhan hill). Vallabhacharya named him as Gopala and the place of his worship as ‘Gopalpur’. Later, Vitthal Nathji named the deity as Shrinathji. Shrinathji's seva is performed in 8 parts of the day.

History

Legend

In 1409, a stone appeared on Govardhan Hill. The stone appeared on nāgpañcamī, thus the locals believed the stone to be an image of a snake deity. Years later on the day of Vallabhācārya's birth, the stone moved further out of the ground, revealing a human head. Śrī Govardhananāthjī then appeared to Saḍḍupāṇḍe in a vision, where he revealed that the stone was his own svarūpa. Later Vallabhācārya visited Saḍḍupāṇḍe, where he heard the story of Śrī Govardhananāthjī's svarūpa. Vallabhācārya then built a shrine and had Śrī Nāthjī installed there. He enlisted Rāmdās Cauhān to perform the regular worship of Śrī Nāthjī.

History
According to the legend, the Srinathji deity self-manifested from stone and emerged from the Govardhan Hills. Historically, the image of Shrinathji was first worshipped at Govardhan hill, near Mathura. The image was initially shifted from Mathura in 1672 A.D. along river Yamuna and was retained at Agra for almost six months, in order to safeguard it from, according to legend, the Mughal ruler Aurangzeb, who wished to keep the prestigious deity with him in Agra. Subsequently, the image was transferred further south on a chariot to a safer place to protect it from barbarian destruction unleashed by Mughal ruler Aurangzeb. When the icon reached the spot at village Sihad or Sinhad in Mewar, the wheels of the chariot in which the icon was being transported sank into mud and could not be moved any farther. The accompanying priests realised that the place was the Shrinathji's chosen spot and, accordingly, the icon was installed in a temple there under the rule and protection of the then Maharana Raj Singh of Mewar. No other Hindu ruler was ready to take the image in his kingdom as it would mean to oppose the Mughal emperor Aurangzeb, who was the most powerful man in Asia at that time.

In the anomical environment of the late 18th and early 19th centuries, the temple of Shrinathji was attacked by the Medas and the Pindaris. Accordingly, the icon was shifted again and was protected at Udaipur and Ghasiyar under the patronage of Maharana Bheem Singh of Mewar.

Nathdwara Temple or Haveli

Shrinathji was brought to Mewar region of Rajasthan through Agra and Gwalior, during the oppressive reign of Aurangazeb, because devotes like Ajab Kunwarbai called him. The chariot carrying the image is believed to have stuck in mud at Sihad village of Mewar while traveling, and hence the idol was established in a temple built with the permission of the current Rana of Mewar.
As per the religious myths, the shrine at Nathdwara was built in the 17th century at the spot as ordained by Shrinathji himself. 
The temple is also popularly called Shrinathji ki Haveli (House of Shrinathji) because like a regular household it has a chariot for movement (In fact the original chariot in which Shrinathji was brought to Singhar), a store room for milk (Doodhghar), a store room for betel (Paanghar), a store room for sugar and sweetmeats (Mishrighar and Pedaghar), a store room for flowers (Phoolghar), a functional kitchen (Rasoighar), a jewellery chamber (Gahnaghar), a treasury (Kharcha bhandaar), a stable for horses of chariot (Ashvashala), a drawing room (Baithak), a gold and silver grinding wheel (Chakki).
There are several prominent temples around the world that pay homage to Shrinathji. The "Nathdwara" of the western hemisphere is known as Vraj. It is located in Schuylkill Haven, Pennsylvania. Over 100,000 Hindus visit Vraj in a year.
The priests and servants within the temple are not paid any cash salaries, receiving simply prasad as a reward for their duties by the tilkayat maharaj. Often this prasad is given or sold to guests who visit the temple for darshan.

Icon at Nathdwara

The holy icon is carved in bas-relief out of a monolithic black marble stone, with images of two cows, one lion, one snake, two peacocks and one parrot engraved on it and three sages placed near it. The idol of Shrinathji wears exquisitely worked jewels, some dating back to pre-Mughal period. Shinathji is adorned with intricately woven shaneels and silk clothes having original zari and embroidery works. This is to be noted that once the cloth(vastra) is being used by the idol is never taken in use again and every day 8 times the idol changes it's cloth(vastras), and during special occasions like janmashtmi, Holi & Diwali the idol wears dresses which are literally woven by gold wires and diamond studded embroideries. Once the vastras which the idol wears, is then given to the devotees. Even the sacred flag above the temple which is changed every day is also woven by gold and silver wires.

Festivals and rituals at the temple
The Shrinathji temple at Nathdwara celebrates, on an average, three festivals in a week. As regards to daily routine, the inner sanctum is opened 8 times a day for the devotees undertake sacred darshan of the deity.
Very elaborate and complex rituals have emerged around the worship of Shrinathji due to confluence and inter-mixing of cult of Krishna as well as that of Pushti Margi Shri Vallabhacharya.

The main attractions of Shrinathji are the Aartis and the Shringar, i.e. the dressing and beautifying of the idol of Shrinathji, treating it as a living child, adorning it with the appropriate dresses commensurate with the time of day or night. The formal prayers are offered with diya, flowers, fruit and other offerings, with local instruments and devotional songs of the Shrinathji, according to the demand of the time and occasion.  The view of the idol after the parda (curtain) is removed is called jhakhi.

The gadipatis and acharyas in the Havelis of Shrinathji are believed to be from the kul (descendants) of shri mahaprabhuji, Vallabhacharya, the founder of this deity's idol at Govardhan hill, near Mathura. Presently, Shrinathji is worshipped by priests from this kul (genealogical descendants) of Vallabh Acharya. In the rest of the world, a Gurjar of a special sect who has initiation and agya (permission) perform the worship of Shrinathji.

Devotees throng to the shrine in large numbers during occasions of Krishna Janmashtami, Radhashtami, Sharad Purnima, Holi and Diwali. The deity is treated like a living image, and is attended with daily normal functions, like bathing, dressing, meals called "Prasad" and the resting times in regular intervals. Since, the deity is believed to be a child form of Krishna, special care is taken and attention is given to the deity, the same way a mother would to her child.

Shrikrishna Janmashtami, the birth anniversary of Lord Krishna is celebrated with the salute of cannons and guns at Nathdwara temple of Shrinathji in Rajasthan.
People not only from the internal regions of Rajasthan but also from Gujarat and Maharashtra, visit Nathdwara to witness Lord Krishna’s seraphic festival. Here, important arrangements are made by the temple trust for security at the police and administrative level. The temple is decorated with attractive light decoration for the festival. The entire city of Nathdwara reverberates owing to the melodious sound of drum, trumpet, and clarinet at the main entrance of the temple. A series of congratulatory exchanges began pouring in a month earlier from the Ashtami of Shravan of the Lord Krishna.
According to the confirmation order, Shri Krishna Janmotsav is not celebrated as a public exhibition in the night, but on the second day, as the Nandamahotsav, that is, by affirming 'Nand Gher Anand Bhayo, Jai Kanhaiya Lal ki’ in the presence of Tilakayat Maharaj Shree and his family, Brajvasi Sevakgan (Brigadian staff), Mukhiyaji (Headman), and Lord Shrinathji along with spattering of milk and curd while dancing in front of them.

Daily ritual of 8 darshans

Legend
The gopies of Vraj used to love the Lord so much, they would be at Yashoda’s door at all hours, finding any excuse to see their beloved Nanda Gopal. Mother Yashoda was very protective of her darling child. Concerned that with all these adoring gopis, hanging around her house at all hours of the day, her darling child will never get any time to rest or play properly with his friends. So she decided that all those who wish to visit her beloved Bala Gopal, could do so after He had finished a snack or a meal, and was resting before going out again.

Ritual
Taking a legend as his cue, Mahaprabhu Vallabhacharya decided to open the haveli, his own version of the Nandalay (House / Palace of Nanda, foster father of Krishna), at specific times of the day only. Acharya set aside eight times of the day when the doors of the inner sanctum would be left open for the people to catch a glimpse ("jakhi") of the Lord. Rest of the time, the Lord was allowed to go out and play with His friends—gopas and gopies of Vraj.

The sequence of eight darshans are set out below.
 Mangala: First darshan of the day. Lord, having woken up, has just had His breakfast and greets his devotees with the most "auspicious" darshan of the day. This darshan usually occurs at dawn.
 Shringar: Having bathed and dressed her little darling, Mother Yashoda allows everyone to adore her baby. After this darshan, the Lord goes out to play with His friends.
 Gval: Having had his mid-morning snack, the Lord is about to go out to herd the cows of Nandaji. Lord is worshipped by reciting His thousand names and the sacred tulsi (basil) leaves are offered with each Name.
 Rajbhog: After His mid-day meal, the Lord is resting in the comfort of Nanadalay. Lord is often most regal and resplendent for this darshan. Fresh garlands and lotuses are offered to the Lord. During the arti, the Lord plays chopat, an ancient board game or version of chess to while away the hot afternoon.
 Utthanpan: Lord has just woken up from His afternoon nap.
 Bhog: Having had His afternoon snack, the Lord is about to go out to play again.
 Sandhya: As the sun dips over the western horizon, the Lord returns with the herds of Nandaji and the gopis come to see their beloved. Mother Yashoda wards off any evil that may have befalled her darling in the woods of Vraj, by doing an arti and the Lord bathes for the evening meal.
 Shayan: Having had His dinner, the Lord is about to go off to his bedchamber. This is the last public darshan of the day.

The outline of darshans given above is a general layout. Over the centuries, different Goswamis have interpreted the "bhavas" and "lilas" differently, resulting in a mixture of oral and ritual traditions followed by the various havelies of Pushti Marg. For example, Shrinathji, having left His beloved Vraj, misses it so dearly, that for six months of the year, He runs back to Vraj for the shayan darshan. So, from Mangala to Sandhya arti, the Lord is reckoned to be in Nathadwara. After the arti, He rushes over, in His spiritual form, to play with the gopis of Vraj. Hence, Shayan arti takes place at Mount Govardhan for the warm half of the year. During the cold months, running over to Vraj is not such a practical option, and hence the shayan darshan takes place at Nathadwara. Here the bhava of gopijan’s viraha and Raasa-Rasika’s unique lila are of paramount importance.

In art and culture
Shrinathji followers have significant influence on Hindu art in the form of the Pichhwais, which are intricate and colourful paintings on cloth, paper, walls and temple hangings which portray Shrinathji. These are devotional textiles that centre on the image of Shrinathji. Nathdwara is the hub of the pichhwai art, Nathdwara Paintings.

Nathdwara is known for the Rajasthani style of the city, which is called "pichhwai Paintings" These pichhwai paintings have been painted on the wall around the Nathdwara temple by famous contemporary artists of Nathdwara.

Worship at other places
Preachers have founded Shrinathji temples in present-day Pakistan (Dera Ghazi Khan), earlier a part of undivided India and not far from Nathdwara. This was done by Shri Lalji Maharaj who was sent to Sindh by Shri Vithalnathji to spread Pushti Marg. Shrinathji is also worshipped at Russia (in the lower Volga region) and other places on the Central Asian trade routes. In the United States, there are eleven Shrinathji temples; New Haven, Connecticut, Parlin, New Jersey, Schuylkill Haven, Pennsylvania, Phoenix, Arizona, one in the midwest, Florida and California, Houston ( Texas), Lowell, Massachusetts Atlanta, Georgia Charlotte, North Carolina Baltimore, Maryland.

In 2013 the first Shrinathji haveli was inaugurated under the guidance of Shri Dwarkeshlalji (kadi kalol) in Melbourne Australia. Vrajdham Haveli located in Margao, Goa was inaugurated in 2013 for the benefit of all the Vaishnavas residing in Goa.

There is a Shrinathji Temple in Bahrain, which was constructed in 1817 and is used by the Hindu community of Bahrain.

There is a shrine dedicated to Shrinathji in the Hindu Temple complex in Dubai, UAE.

See also
Dwarkadhish Ji
Charbhuja
Kankroli
Sanwaliaji

References and notes

Further reading
Ambalal, Amit: Krishna as Shrinathji: Rajasthan Paintings from Nathdwara, Mapin, Ahmedabad (1987)
Gaston, Anne-Marie: Krishna’s Musicians: Musicians and Music making in the Temples of Nathdvara, Rajasthan, Manohar, New Delhi (1997)
Jindel, Rajendra: Culture of a sacred town : a sociological study of Nathdwara, Popular Prakashan, Bombay (1976).
Jones, Constance & James D. Ryan: Encyclopedia of Hinduism 
Lyons, Tryna: The artists of Nathadwara: The practice of painting in Rajasthan, Indiana University Press (2004)
 PushtiRang.com - Spread Pushtimargiya Articles around the globe via online medium

Religion in Rajasthan
Titles and names of Krishna
Forms of Krishna